Sean Roberts (born 2 January 1983) is a South African retired football goalkeeper who last played for Premier Soccer League club Chippa United. After his time at Ajax, Sean had a quick stint at Chippa United where his sterling leadership and performances helped win the club promotion back to the South African PSL. Just after retiring from professional football, Sean joined Rygersdal Football Club where he featured in the club's "Drongos" team - in his first and only appearance for the amateur outfit, he conceded a sloppy goal and vowed never to set foot on a football field again as a player.

Sean now enjoys a great career as a football agent, TV presenter and motivational speaker. He has built his own brand and continues to inspire young aspiring sports people.

References

1983 births
South African soccer players
Living people
Bidvest Wits F.C. players
Association football goalkeepers
Cape Town Spurs F.C. players
Sportspeople from Durban
Singapore Premier League players
English footballers
Margate F.C. players
Sheffield Wednesday F.C. players
Mamelodi Sundowns F.C. players
White South African people
Home United FC players
Expatriate footballers in Singapore